Luca Cecconi (born 24 January 1964 in Fucecchio, Province of Florence) is an Italian football manager and former striker.

Playing career
Cecconi played with several teams throughout his career, obtaining his best successes with Palermo, Bologna and Como.

Coaching career
In 1999 Cecconi was appointed as Empoli Primavera youth squad coach, winning a Torneo di Viareggio in 2000. He left Empoli in 2003, being appointed one year later as Prato head coach and serving in the four initial matchdays of the 2004-05 Serie C1 season, all ended in a defeat for his side.

He then worked alongside Renzo Ulivieri at Bologna in 2005, and again during the 2006–07 season, and successively replaced him in April 2007, serving as caretaker head coach in the two remaining months of their Serie B campaign.

References

External links
Playing career

1964 births
Living people
People from Fucecchio
Italian footballers
ACF Fiorentina players
Empoli F.C. players
Pisa S.C. players
Brescia Calcio players
Catania S.S.D. players
Palermo F.C. players
Como 1907 players
Bologna F.C. 1909 players
U.S. Pistoiese 1921 players
Association football forwards
Serie A players
Serie B players
Serie C players
Sportspeople from the Metropolitan City of Florence
Footballers from Tuscany